Mylai may refer to:
Mylai (Cilicia), a town of ancient Cilicia, now in Turkey
Mylai (Sicily), a city of ancient Sicily, Italy
Mylai (Thessaly), a town of ancient Thesssaly, Greece
a place in the Sơn Tịnh District, Vietnam, scene of a notorious massacre
"Mylai", a short form of Mylapore, a heritage locality in Chennai, India